Sepidareh may refer to:
 Sepidareh, Namshir, Baneh County, Kurdistan Province
 Sepidareh, West Azerbaijan
 Sepidareh-ye Darmeh, West Azerbaijan Province